Dana Amir (born 1966) is a full professor at Haifa University, clinical psychologist, psychoanalyst, poetess and literature researcher.

Biography
Dana Amir was born and raised in Haifa

and attended the Hebrew Reali School.  She has B.A. in psychology and philosophy, M.A. in clinical psychology and Ph.D in the philosophy of psychoanalysis. She wrote her PhD thesis on The Lyrical Dimension of Mental Space.
All degrees were obtained from Haifa University.

Dana Amir is a clinical psychologist, training and supervising psychoanalyst, at the International Psychoanalytic Association and at the Israel psychoanalytic society. She is a full professor, vice dean for research
and head of the interdisciplinary doctoral program in psychoanalysis, department of counseling and human development at Haifa University, and the editor in chief of Maarag - the Israel Annual of Psychoanalysis (published by the Hebrew University).

Her research, which received the Israel Science Foundation research grant more than once, focuses on the connection between language and psychopathology.

Amir developed several psycho-linguistic concepts which map various pathological dimensions: "Pseudo-Language" versus "Concrete Language",

"Psychotic Syntax",

"Autistic Syntax",

"The Chameleon Language of perversion"

and "the inner function of the witness".

She is also researching modes of traumatic testimony,

and the language of the perpetrator.

Poetry

Dana Amir published seven poetry books, and her poems were published in various journals in Hebrew as well as in Anthologies in French and Spanish. 

Tzipi Non-Gross, Tal Nitzan and Haim Be'er wrote in their argument to award the Nathan Alterman poetry prize to Dana Amir:
“Dana Amir’s book is an impressive collection that includes a new poetry division and an essay on poetry inspired by Duineser Elegien by Rilke. The compilation follows the evolution of Amir’s poetry and enable the understanding of this poetry in its metamorphosis: This is a dialogue poetry per se, intimate and exposed. Amir’s poetry is characterized by a combination of sensitivity and wisdom. Its subtle and penetrating glance is crystalized here into pure, divine lyrics, and produces an exquisite and appealing volume, one of the most beautiful ever written in Hebrew”.

Awards

Literary
1993 - The Adler National Poetry Prize  
2012 - The Prime-Minister National Prize for Hebrew Literature
2013 - Nathan Alterman poetry prize for All My Names

Academic
 2006 - The Bahat Prize for Academic Original Book   
 2011 - The Frances Tustin International Memorial Prize
 2013 - The IPA (International Psychoanalytic Association) Sacerdoti Prize
 2017 - Distinguished Psychoanalytic Educators Award for Outstanding Contributions to Psychoanalytic Education
 2017 - The IPA (International Psychoanalytic Association) Hayman Prize
 2020 - The Outstanding Senior Researcher Award of the University of Haifa
 2020 - The annual International Journal of Applied Psychoanalytic Studies prize for the best paper published in 2020.

Selected works

Psychoanalytic non-fiction books
 Amir, D. (2008). On the Lyricism of the Mind, Haifa University and Magness Press, Jerusalem (Hebrew), Winner of the Bahat Prize, 2006. 110 pp.
 Amir, D. (2016). On the Lyricism of the Mind: Psychoanalysis and Literature. New-   York: Routledge. (Translated from Hebrew). 100 pp.
  Amir, D. (2013). Cleft Tongue, A Psychoanalytic Study of  Psychopathology and Language. Magness Press, Jerusalem. (Hebrew). Published with the support of The Israel Science Foundation (ISF). 182 pp.
 Amir, D. (2014). Cleft Tongue: The Language of Psychic Structures.  New-York and London: Karnac Books.  (Translated from Hebrew with back cover text by Professor Alessandra Lemma, Unit Director, Psychological Therapies Development Unit, Tavistock Center). 161 pp.
 Amir, D. (2018). Bearing Witness to the Witness: A Psychoanalytic Perspective on Four Modes of Traumatic Testimony.  London & New-York: Routledge (foreword by prof. Dori Laub). 170 pp.
 Amir, D. (2018). Bearing Witness to the Witness: Four Modes of Traumatic Testimony. Jerusalem: Magness (Hebrew translation from English). Published with the support of the Research Authority of the University of Haifa. Published Verse (Hebrew)  236 pp. 
 Amir, D. (2020). Screen Confessions. Resling  (Hebrew)  160  pp.
 Amir, D. (2021). Psychoanalysis on the Verge of Language: Clinical Cases on the Edge. New-York and London: Routledge.

Published verse (books in Hebrew)
 Amir, D. (1993). Now, in this Sweetness, Tel-Aviv: Sifriat Hapo'alim.
 Amir, D. (1998). Until the Earth Comes, Tel-Aviv: Hakibbutz Hame'uhad.
 Amir, D. (2004). The Life of Ahino'am, Tel-Aviv: Rhythmus-Hakibbutz Hame'uhad.
 Amir, D. (2007). Poems of Innig, Tel-Aviv: Rhythmus-Hakibbutz Hame'uhad. 
 Amir, D. All My Names (2014), Selected Poems. Tel-Aviv: Hakibitz Hameuhad.
 Amir, D. Rending (2016). Ra'anana: Even Hoshen.
 Amir, D. Kaddish on Light and Darkness (2019). Tel-Aviv: Afik.
 Amir, D. Millstones (2021). Tel-Aviv: Afik.

References

External links
Dana Amir's profile, in Google Scholar

1966 births
Academic staff of the University of Haifa
Israeli women poets
Israeli poets
Israeli literary critics
Israeli women literary critics
Living people
Israeli non-fiction writers
People from Haifa